A urogenital neoplasm is a tumor of the urogenital system.

Types
Types include:
 Cancer of the female genital organs: (Cervical cancer, Endometrial cancer, Ovarian cancer, Uterine cancer, Vaginal cancer, Vaginal tumors, Vulvar cancer)
 Cancer of the male genital organs (Carcinoma of the penis, Prostate cancer, Testicular cancer)
 Cancer of the urinary organs (Bladder cancer, Renal cell carcinoma)

References

External links 

 
Gynaecological cancer